Xín Mần is a rural commune of Xín Mần District, Hà Giang Province, Vietnam.

References

Populated places in Hà Giang province